The following is a partial list of concertos by Joseph Haydn (1732–1809).  In the Hoboken catalogue of Haydn's works, concertos for most instruments are in category VII with a different letter for each solo instrument (VIIa is for violin concertos, VIIb is for cello concertos, etc.).  The exceptions are the concertos for keyboard and for baryton which are placed in categories XVIII and XIII, respectively.

For violin

Violin Concerto No. 1 in C major, Hob. VIIa:1 (ca. 1765)
 Violin Concerto No. 2 in D major, Hob. VIIa:2 (1765, lost)
Violin Concerto No. 3 in A major, Hob. VIIa:3 "Melker Konzert" (ca. 1770)
Violin Concerto No. 4 in G major, Hob. VIIa:4 (1769)

Other Concertos (Hob. VIIa:A1/B1/B2/D1/G1) are not authentic, i.e. are not by Joseph Haydn.
- D1 - Concerto, in D major, for violin and orchestra (2 oboes, 2 horns, 2 violins, viola and bass) (work by Carl Stamitz?)
- G1 - Concerto, in G major, for violin and strings (2 violins, viola and bass) (work by Michael Haydn?)
- A1 - Concerto, in A major, for violin and … (work by Giovanni Mane Giornovichi?)
- B1 - Concerto, in B flat major, for violin and strings (2 violins, viola and bass) (by Michael Haydn)
- B2 - Concerto, in B flat major, for violin and strings (2 violins, viola and bass) (by Christian Cannabich)

For violoncello

Cello Concerto No. 1 in C, Hob. VIIb:1 (1761-5)
Cello Concerto No. 2 in D, Hob. VIIb:2 (Op. 101) (1783)
Cello Concerto No. 3 in C, Hob. VIIb:3 (ca. 1780, lost)
Cello Concerto No. 4 in D, Hob. VIIb:4 (spurious, written by Giovanni Battista Costanzi in 1772?)
Cello Concerto No. 5 in C-Major, Hob. VIIb:5 (spurious, written by David Popper in 1899)
Cello Concerto in G minor, Hob. VIIb:g1 (ca. 1773, doubtful, lost)

For violone (double bass)

Violone Concerto in D, Hob. VIIc:1 (lost; may have been burned and destroyed?)

For horn

Horn Concerto in D major, Hob. VIId:1 (1765, lost)
Concerto for Two Horns in E flat, Hob. VIId:2 (ca. 1760, lost)
Horn Concerto No. 1 in D, Hob. VIId:3 (1762)
Horn Concerto No. 2 in D, Hob. VIId:4 (uncertain; possibly by Michael Haydn) (1781)
Concerto for Two Horns in E flat, Hob. VIId:5 (uncertain; possibly by Michael Haydn or Antonio Rosetti; maybe Hob. VIId:2?)

For trumpet

Trumpet Concerto in E flat, Hob. VIIe:1 (1796)

For flute
Flute Concerto in D, Hob. VIIf:1 (lost, 1780?)
Flute Concerto in D, Hob. VIIf:D1 (ca. 1760, spurious, by Leopold Hoffman)
Haydn also wrote several more concertos, which have all been lost.

For oboe

Oboe Concerto in C major, Hob. VIIg:C1 (1790?) (doubtful, possibly by Ignaz Malzat)

For 2 lire organizzate

These concertos were written for Ferdinand IV, King of Naples whose favorite instrument was the lira organizzata -- an instrument similar to the hurdy-gurdy.  Modern performances use flute and oboe (or two flutes) as the soloists.

Concerto No. 1 in C major, Hob. VIIh:1 (1786) 
Concerto No. 2 in G major, Hob. VIIh:2 (1786) 
Concerto No. 3 in G major, Hob. VIIh:3 (1786)  "Romance" movement later adapted to become the "Military" movement of Symphony No. 100 
Concerto No. 4 in F major, Hob. VIIh:4 (1786) 
Concerto No. 5 in F major, Hob. VIIh:5 (1786)  second and third movement later adapted to be part of Symphony No. 89

For baryton

There are 3 concertos for baryton known but which have been lost or have doubtful authenticity.
Concerto for baryton in D, Hob. XIII:1 (before 1770)
Concerto for baryton in D, Hob. XIII:2 (before 1770)
Concerto for 2 barytons in D, Hob. XIII:3 (before 1770)

For harpsichord, organ or piano

Keyboard Concerto No. 1 in C, Hob. XVIII:1 (1756)
Keyboard Concerto No. 2 in D, Hob. XVIII:2 (1767)
Keyboard Concerto No. 3 in F, Hob. XVIII:3 (1765)
Keyboard Concerto No. 4 in G, Hob. XVIII:4 (1770)
Keyboard Concerto No. 5 in C, Hob. XVIII:5 (uncertain authenticity, perhaps to be attributed to Georg Christoph Wagenseil, 1763)
Keyboard and Violin Concerto No. 6 in F (Double Concerto), Hob. XVIII:6 (1766)
Keyboard Concerto No. 7 in F, Hob. XVIII:7  (exists with a different slow movement as the piano trio Hob. XV:40; uncertain authenticity, perhaps to be attributed to Georg Christoph Wagenseil, 1766)
Keyboard Concerto No. 8 in C, Hob. XVIII:8 (uncertain authenticity, perhaps to be attributed to Leopold Hofmann, 1766)
Keyboard Concerto No. 9 in G, Hob. XVIII:9 (uncertain authenticity, 1767)
Keyboard Concerto No. 10 in C, Hob. XVIII:10 (1771)
Keyboard Concerto No. 11 in D, Hob. XVIII:11 (1782) 
Keyboard Concerto in E flat, Hob. XVIII:Es1 (doubtful authenticity)
Keyboard Concerto in F, Hob. XVIII:F1 (spurious authenticity, written by Georg Joseph Vogler)
Keyboard Concerto in F, Hob. XVIII:F2 (doubtful authenticity)
Keyboard Concerto in F, Hob. XVIII:F3 (doubtful authenticity, perhaps to be attributed to Johann Georg Lang)
Keyboard Concerto in G, Hob. XVIII:G1 (doubtful authenticity)
Concerto for Two Keyboards in G, Hob. XVIII:G2 (doubtful authenticity)

On the above list, where as noted Nos. 5, 7, 8, 9 are doubtful, only Nos. 3, 4, and 11 are considered confirmed as genuine.

Two works often identified and even published as piano concertos by Haydn, and commonly taught to younger piano students, are actually Divertimenti, grouped in Hob. XIV.  Specifically, they are Hob. XIV:3 (the "Little Concerto" in C major), and Hob. XIV:4 (another "concerto" in C major).  However, another work of similar technical difficulty that is also identified and published as a concerto is the Concerto in F, Hob. XVIII:F1.

See also
 List of compositions by Joseph Haydn

Notes

References
The New Grove Encyclopedia of Music and Musicians offers a complete list, with the current best-estimate dating, of Haydn's concertos and other works.  The listing is repeated in the spin-off volume by Webster and Feder, The New Grove Haydn.

Concertos